A. H. Salunkhe is a  Marathi author, scholar and social activist related to  Satya Shodhak Samaj and to the Shivdharma movement.

He was the president of Maharashtra State Cultural Policy, 2010.

Born in a small farmer family at Khadewadi in Sangli district, he completed his graduation from Shivaji Vidyapeeth with a doctorate in Sanskrit.  He worked as a Head of Department at a college in Satara.  He was art faculty dean at the Shivaji University, Kolhapur.

Salunkhe was awarded the Bhai Madhavrao Bagal award in 2007, instituted by the Madhavraoji Bagal Vidhyapeeth, Kolhapur.

References 

Marathi-language writers
People from Satara district
Living people
Shivaji University alumni
Year of birth missing (living people)